{{Speciesbox
|genus=Drosera
|species=planchonii
|authority=Hook.f. ex Planch.
|synonyms_ref=
|synonyms=*Drosera macrantha subsp. planchonii 
Drosera menziesi var. albiflora Sondera planchonii (Hook.f. ex Planch.) 
}}Drosera planchonii'' is a species of carnivorous plant endemic to Australia. It was first formally named in 1848.

References

planchonii
Endemic flora of Australia